Miroslav Fryčer (27 September 195927 April 2021) was a Czech ice hockey forward who played eight seasons in the National Hockey League (NHL). He played for the Quebec Nordiques, Toronto Maple Leafs, Detroit Red Wings, and Edmonton Oilers from 1981 to 1989. After retiring, he served as head coach of Orli Znojmo in the Austrian-based Erste Bank Hockey League. He was often referred to by his nicknames of Mirko or Miro.

Fryčer played hockey in Czechoslovakia until he defected in 1981. He was signed by the Quebec Nordiques and made his NHL debut that same year, before being traded to the Toronto Maple Leafs. He spent seven seasons with that organization, making one All-Star appearance in 1985 and leading the team in points one year later. After a public spat with head coach John Brophy, Fryčer was traded to the Detroit Red Wings at the end of the 1987–88 season. He was then dealt to the Edmonton Oilers in January 1989, before returning to Europe.

Early life
Fryčer was born in Opava, Czechoslovakia, on 27 September 1959. He played for Vitkovice from 1976 until 1981. He defected to Canada via Bern, Switzerland, in 1981 when he was with the Czechoslovakian national team from the team hotel, together with his parents, his then-wife and their 10-month old daughter. He was signed as an undrafted free agent by the Quebec Nordiques before the 1981–82 season.

Professional career

Nordiques and Maple Leafs (1981–1988)
Fryčer started his NHL career with the Quebec Nordiques in 1981. In his Colisée de Québec debut, he scored a hat-trick in a 6–4 win over the Toronto Maple Leafs. This, along with his 20 goals in 49 games, drew the interest of the Leafs. Fryčer was subsequently traded to that franchise on 9 March 1982, for Wilf Paiement. He played a key role in keeping the Leafs in contention for the playoffs that year, coming on as an extra attacker with less than a minute remaining and scoring the game-winning goal against the St. Louis Blues. He finished his debut season with the second-most hat-tricks in the league with five.

Fryčer hit 20 or more goals in his first three full NHL seasons (1982, 1983, and 1985). He was named to his only All-Star Game in 1985, and was the only player from the Leafs to be selected. He went on to lead the franchise in points with 75 the following season. He scored four of the Leafs' eleven goals in a 11–9 win over the Edmonton Oilers in January 1986. This was the highest scoring game at the Maple Leaf Gardens. The Leafs advanced to the Stanley Cup playoffs, where they eliminated the Chicago Blackhawks in an upset, before bowing out in the Division Finals to the Blues in seven games. He finished third in the NHL in hat-tricks (3) that year.

The Leafs brought in John Brophy in 1986 to replace Dan Maloney as head coach. Fryčer, who had hoped that the latter would stay on for an additional season, was stripped of the alternate captaincy and clashed publicly with Brophy over the next two seasons. Brophy attempted to goad Fryčer during one practice by slashing him on his surgically repaired knee, thus re-injuring it. After a defeat at the New York Islanders, the pair engaged in a physical altercation that saw Fryčer grab Brophy by the throat. At the conclusion of the 1987–88 season, in which the Leafs won only 21 games, both Fryčer and Börje Salming pointed the finger at Brophy for the team's dismal performance. Fryčer, requested to be traded, contended that 90 percent of the players "despise working for the coach" and he vowed to never play under Brophy again. About a month after the outburst, new Leafs general manager Gord Stellick confirmed that Fryčer would not be returning to the team the following year. He was subsequently traded to the Detroit Red Wings on 10 June 1988 for Darren Veitch.

Red Wings and Oilers (1988–1989)
During the first half of the 1988–89 season, Fryčer scored 7 goals and added 8 assists in 23 games for the Red Wings. In his second game back at the Maple Leaf Gardens in December 1988, he scored two goals in an 8–2 win for his new team. Fryčer celebrated by flashing the middle finger at Brophy while skating past the Leafs bench. He stated after the game that he hoped to get Brophy fired, adding that "he deserves it"; and Brophy was indeed dismissed as head coach that same month. Fryčer was traded mid-season to the Edmonton Oilers on 3 January 1989. He played 14 games for the franchise (contributing 5 goals and 5 assists), before opting to play in Europe during the 1990 Stanley Cup playoffs. He consequently missed out being part of the Oilers' Stanley Cup-winning team that year. He went on to play two seasons in Freiburg for EHC Freiburg and a season with HC Brunico, playing in Italian Serie A and in Alpenliga.

International
Fryčer played for the Czechoslovak national team at the 1980 Winter Olympics. He finished the tournament with one goal and two assists and the team placed fifth overall.

Post-playing career
After retiring from professional hockey, Fryčer served as head coach of HC Vítkovice, and coached in the Czech Republic and in Italy. He was later the coach of Czech-based ice hockey team Orli Znojmo for the 2018-19 and 2019–20 seasons.

Personal life
Fryčer was married three times. His first two marriages ended in divorce.

Fryčer was sentenced to 14 days' imprisonment in 1986, after being convicted for a second time of impaired driving. He later released an autobiography in 2018 titled My Wild Hockey Life, which detailed his defection and his struggle with health problems partly brought on by alcohol abuse early in his career. He underwent a liver transplant in 1999, and a kidney transplant in 2018.

Fryčer died on 27 April 2021 in his hometown of Kobeřice, Czech Republic. He was 61, and had reportedly been hospitalized for a blood disorder.

Career statistics
Sources:

Regular season and playoffs

International

See also
List of Soviet and Eastern Bloc defectors

References

External links 
 

1959 births
2021 deaths
Czech ice hockey coaches
Czech ice hockey right wingers
Czechoslovak ice hockey right wingers
Czechoslovak defectors
HC Vítkovice players
Detroit Red Wings players
Edmonton Oilers players
EHC Freiburg players
Fredericton Express players
Ice hockey players at the 1980 Winter Olympics
National Hockey League All-Stars
Olympic ice hockey players of Czechoslovakia
Sportspeople from Opava
Quebec Nordiques players
Toronto Maple Leafs players
Undrafted National Hockey League players
Czechoslovak expatriate sportspeople in Canada
Czechoslovak emigrants to Canada
Czechoslovak expatriate sportspeople in the United States
Czechoslovak expatriate sportspeople in West Germany
Czechoslovak expatriate sportspeople in Germany
Czechoslovak expatriate sportspeople in Italy
Czechoslovak expatriate ice hockey people
Czech expatriate ice hockey players in Germany
Expatriate ice hockey players in the United States
Expatriate ice hockey players in West Germany
Expatriate ice hockey players in Canada
Expatriate ice hockey players in Italy